"Aïcha" is a song written by French singer-songwriter Jean-Jacques Goldman, performed by Algerian raï artist Khaled. In 1996, the song was released as a single containing two versions: a French version and a bilingual version sung in both French and Arabic. The Arabic lyrics were written by Khaled. On his 1996 album Sahra, the bilingual version is featured. The song's music video, which also uses the mixed language version, was directed by Sarah Moon.

Lyrics / theme
The song's lyrics are about a woman named Aïcha, who is being wooed by a man. He promises her pearls, jewels, poems, and other luxuries and romantic things, to which she replies:

Keep your treasures
I am worth more than all that
Bars are bars, even if made of gold
I want the same rights as you
And respect for each day
I don't want anything but love

The song's chorus has the following words in French (with English translation):

 = Aisha, Aisha, listen to me
 = Aisha, Aisha, don't go away
 = Aisha, Aisha, look at me
 = Aisha, Aisha, answer me

The lyrics were all in French. The Arabic verse, written and sung by Khaled, is as follows:

 (Nbghīk ʿāysha wanmūt ʿalīk) = I want you Aisha and would die for you
 (Hādī ksayat ḥayātī waḥabbī) = This is the story of my life and my love
 (ʾAnti ʿumrī wʾanti ḥayātī) = You are my years and you are my life
 (Tmannīt nʿaysh mʿāk ghayr ʾanti) = I wish to live with you, only you

Track listings
 CD single
 "Aïcha" — 4:20
 "Aïcha" (version mixte) — 4:20

Charts

Peak positions

Year-end charts

Certifications

Outlandish version

In June 2003, Danish hip hop band Outlandish released an English version of the song, "Aicha", that was included on their album Bread & Barrels of Water (2002). Their version was produced by the band along with Mintman. The song peaked at number one in Germany, the Netherlands, Romania, Sweden, and Switzerland and became a top-10 hit Austria, Flanders, and Norway. A video was also shot for the single.

Track listings
CD maxi
 "Aicha" (4:37)
 "Aicha" (Mintman Remix) (4:34)
 "Aicha" (Instrumental) (4:08)
 Outlandish feat. Majid & Asmaá – "El Moro" (5:24)

Charts

Weekly charts

Year-end charts

Other versions
The original song has since been remade by several singers and bands:
 The French version was performed by Khaled with fellow Raï singer Faudel at the famous 1998 1,2,3 Soleils concert in Paris
 Between 1996-1997, the Egyptian-born Brazilian singer Gilbert performed the song. The song was part of 1997-1998 Brazilian telenovela Por Amor soundtrack.
 A zouk version was made by Kassav'
 A salsa version was made by Africando
 A cappella versions by Penn Masala, Stanford Raagapella, Alaa Wardi, and Aquabella
 Indian/Dubai based singer, Rayshad Rauf adapted Outlandish's chorus part in one of his Mashups Don't,
 A nasheed (Islamic) version by Omar Esa

It has been adapted to several other languages:
 An Urdu version by Amanat Ali, titled Aaisha, was featured on the Pakistani Music program Coke Studio.
 A French / Arabic version by Lobo Ismail with altered lyrics and added a uniquely composed Arabic language rap sequence 
 An English rock version by Outlandish
 A Polish version by Magma 
 A Malay version with bits of Arabic by Yasin, titled as Aishah .
 A Serbian version was made by Dragana Mirković and was titled Hajde pogledaj me (Come on, look at me) 
 A Korean version by Tony An titled Aisha
 A Hebrew version, titled "Aisha", was written by Ehud Manor and performed by Haim Moshe 
 A Turkish version by Mutaf, titled "Ayşa"
 A Turkmen version by Mekan Ataýew, titled "Aişa"
 A Greek version, titled "M'aresei" (Greek: M'αρεσει), was performed by Kostas Bigalis. Video on youtube.
 A second Greek version, titled "Alithia Sou Leo", was performed by Stamatis Gonidis in 2006 
 A Spanish / Arabic version titled "Aicha" by Amistades Peligrosas 
 A Croatian version was made by Duško Lokin. Song title is Aisha.
 A Norwegian version titled Aisha" was made by Emiré og Lillebror 
 A Breton version, Aisha, was made by Manau.
 A techno, Oriental, acoustic-guitar version was performed by guitarist Muayad Jajo in Sulaimaniya in August 2014, published by Elite Studios.
 A German version titled Aicha by Moe Phoenix
 A Mandarin Chinese version titled Aicha by Ayisha Elseenya on youtube

See also
 List of Romanian Top 100 number ones of the 2000s

References

1996 singles
1996 songs
2003 singles
Barclay (record label) singles
Bertelsmann Music Group singles
Dutch Top 40 number-one singles
French-language songs
Khaled (musician) songs
Macaronic songs
Number-one singles in Germany
Number-one singles in Romania
Number-one singles in Sweden
Number-one singles in Switzerland
Raï
RCA Records singles
Songs containing the I–V-vi-IV progression
Songs written by Jean-Jacques Goldman
SNEP Top Singles number-one singles
Ultratop 50 Singles (Wallonia) number-one singles

es:Anexo:Discografía de Khaled#Aïcha